Michael Jerome Young (9 October 19368 April 1996) was an Australian politician. He rose through the Australian Labor Party (ALP) to become its National Secretary, before serving as a Labor member of the House of Representatives from the 1974 election to 1988. He was a senior minister in the Hawke government, and was a prominent political figure during the 1970s and 1980s. Young was also President of the Australian Labor Party from 1986 to 1988.

Early life
Born in Sydney to Irish Catholic parents, Young attended school at Marist Brothers College in the Sydney suburb of Mosman. After his high school days he worked as a shearer and roustabout before becoming an organiser with the Australian Workers' Union in South Australia.

Early political involvement
He was appointed as the party's South Australian state organiser in 1964, and his role in the first Labor electoral win for 30 years at the 1965 state election (the election resulted in Frank Walsh becoming Labor Premier) led first to his election as Secretary of the state branch in 1968 and later secretary of the federal party in 1969. Gough Whitlam, then Opposition Leader, hired Young as an adviser during this period.

Young again showed his substantial campaign management skills in the 1972 federal election, playing a significant role in the first ALP federal election win since 1946. He devised Labor's "It's Time" slogan, still considered one of the most effective vote-winning phrases in Australian history.

Federal politics
Touted as a potential successor to Whitlam as Labor leader, Young gained preselection for the safe Labor seat of Port Adelaide and was comfortably elected to parliament at the 1974 election. Labor under Whitlam suffered its worst-ever electoral defeat in late 1975; Young was promoted to the shadow ministry in 1976, and was given the Immigration and Ethnic Affairs portfolios.

Young has been credited with keeping Labor's spirits up during its time in opposition from 1975 to 1983. A future party leader, Kim Beazley Jr., considered Young on a par with Paul Keating as the most effective baiter of Liberal politicians, although Young "was much funnier, but gentler as well". One of Young's attacks on the Liberals targeted Alexander Downer, who was seen as a wealthy snob by the ALP; Young said "His gatehouse is bigger than The Lodge" (the official home of the Australian Prime Minister).

Following the landslide ALP victory at the 1983 federal election, Young was initially appointed Special Minister of State (and Vice-President of the Executive Council until July 1983), but was forced to stand down in 1983 when he breached Cabinet security, as part of the Combe-Ivanov affair. This did not do him lasting political damage, though, and five months later he became Special Minister of State again. He was forced to step down again in 1984 when he neglected to declare at Customs a large stuffed Paddington Bear toy that was in his wife's suitcase. He resumed his place in Cabinet when he was cleared of wrongdoing by a judicial inquiry.

In February 1987 he was appointed Minister for Immigration and Ethnic Affairs.  He was also made Leader of the House of Representatives.  He became Minister for Immigration, Local Government and Ethnic Affairs in July 1987, when he also took on the position of Vice-President of the Executive Council again.  While immigration minister, he introduced the custom of conducting formal briefings for the press gallery, based on the idea that it was preferable to freely provide information to the media with your own spin than for them to gain the information from other sources and put their own spin on it.

As a member of parliament, Young remained actively involved in social justice issues. In 1984, during a contentious national ALP conference where nuclear issues were under debate, he openly spoke out against uranium mining, and invited anti-uranium mining activists to use his office as a base. He also made available copies of the secret Fox Report on Ranger Uranium to anti-nuclear protesters and supported their campaign to have the City of Port Adelaide declared a Nuclear Free Zone. In addition he was active in supporting refugees and multiculturalism, and launched an inquiry on immigration policy aimed at reforming the system during his term as minister.

In 1987, Young faced controversy over his alleged handling of campaign donations during the 1987 election. He subsequently resigned from parliament on 12 February 1988, sparking the 1988 Port Adelaide by-election, though he was later cleared of any wrongdoing.

Later life
Following his resignation from parliament, Young worked as a lobbyist, chaired the Federal Government Multicultural Advisory Council and completed a review for the ALP following the 1995 Queensland state election.  He also continued to serve as guide to promising Labor politicians, including Beazley, who considered Young his best friend.

Young's premature death in Sydney, of leukaemia, on 8 April 1996, was felt greatly by the Labor Party and his state funeral was well attended. An annual scholarship was set up in his name to assist disadvantaged children and adults in furthering their education.

References 

 FitzSimons, P. Beazley: a Biography, HarperCollins, Pymble, NSW, 1998. 
 McMullin, R. The Light on the Hill: The Australian Labor Party 1891–1991, Oxford University Press, Melbourne, 1991.  
 Faulkner, J. et al. (ed.) True believers : the story of the federal parliamentary Labor Party,  Allen & Unwin, Crows Nest, NSW., 2001. 

1936 births
1996 deaths
Australian Labor Party members of the Parliament of Australia
Members of the Australian House of Representatives for Port Adelaide
Members of the Australian House of Representatives
Leaders of the Australian House of Representatives
Members of the Cabinet of Australia
Australian trade unionists
Combe–Ivanov affair
20th-century Australian politicians
Australian Labor Party officials